The Women's 55 kg competition at the 2022 European Karate Championships was held from 26 to 28 May 2022.

Results

Finals

Repechage

Top half

Section 1

Section 2

Bottom half

Section 3

Section 4

References

External links
Draw

Women's 55 kg
2022 in women's karate